The 1993 Girabola was the 15th season of top-tier football competition in Angola. C.D. Primeiro de Agosto were the defending champions.

The league comprised 12 teams, the bottom two of which were relegated.

Petro de Luanda were crowned champions, winning their 8th title, while Académica do Lobito, Desportivo da Nocal and FC de Cabinda were relegated.

Serginho of Desportivo da EKA finished as the top scorer with 14 goals.

Changes from the 1992 season
Relegated: Inter de Luanda, Benfica de Cabinda
Withdrew: Benfica do Huambo, Ferroviário da Huíla, Petro do Huambo, Sporting de Benguela
Promoted: Académica do Lobito, Progresso do Sambizanga

League table

Results

Season statistics

Top scorer
 Serginho

Champions

External links
Federação Angolana de Futebol

Girabola seasons
Angola
Angola